Lepthyphantes is a genus of  dwarf spiders that was first described by Anton Menge in 1866.

Species
 it contains 161 species and two subspecies, found in Albania, Algeria, Angola, Brazil, Cameroon, Canada, Chile, China, Comoros, Middle Africa, Cyprus, Ethiopia, France, Georgia, Greece, Greenland, India, Indonesia, Iran, Israel, Italy, Japan, Kazakhstan, Kenya, Korea, Kyrgyzstan, Lebanon, Moldova, Mongolia, Morocco, Portugal, Romania, Russia, South Africa, Spain, Sweden, Tajikistan, Tanzania, Tunisia, Turkey, Turkmenistan, Uganda, and the United States:

L. abditus Tanasevitch, 1986 – Russia (Caucasus)
L. aberdarensis Russell-Smith & Jocqué, 1986 – Kenya
L. acuminifrons Bosmans, 1978 – Ethiopia
L. aegeus Caporiacco, 1948 – Greece
L. aelleni Denis, 1957 – Morocco
L. afer (Simon, 1913) – Algeria
L. ajoti Bosmans, 1991 – Algeria
L. albimaculatus (O. Pickard-Cambridge, 1873) – St. Helena
L. albuloides (O. Pickard-Cambridge, 1872) – Cyprus, Israel
L. aldersoni Levi, 1955 – Canada
L. allegrii Caporiacco, 1935 – Karakorum
L. alpinus (Emerton, 1882) – Russia (Far East), North America
L. altissimus Hu, 2001 – China
L. annulipes Caporiacco, 1935 – Karakorum
L. arcticus (Keyserling, 1886) – USA (Alaska)
L. badhkyzensis Tanasevitch, 1986 – Turkmenistan
L. bakeri Scharff, 1990 – Tanzania
L. balearicus Denis, 1961 – Spain (Balearic Is.)
L. bamboutensis Bosmans, 1986 – Cameroon
L. bamilekei Bosmans, 1986 – Cameroon
L. beroni Deltshev, 1979 – Greece
L. beshkovi Deltshev, 1979 – Greece (Crete)
L. bhudbari Tikader, 1970 – India
L. bidentatus Hormiga & Ribera, 1990 – Spain
L. biospeleologorum Barrientos, 2020 – Morocco
L. biseriatus Simon & Fage, 1922 – Kenya
Lepthyphantes b. infans Simon & Fage, 1922 – East Africa
L. bituberculatus Bosmans, 1978 – Ethiopia
L. brevihamatus Bosmans, 1985 – Morocco
L. brignolianus Deltshev, 1979 – Greece (Crete)
L. buensis Bosmans & Jocqué, 1983 – Cameroon
L. carlittensis Denis, 1952 – France
L. cavernicola Paik & Yaginuma, 1969 – Korea
L. centromeroides Kulczyński, 1914 – Balkans, Romania
Lepthyphantes c. carpaticus Dumitrescu & Georgescu, 1970 – Romania
L. chamberlini Schenkel, 1950 – USA, Canada
L. chita Scharff, 1990 – Tanzania
L. christodeltshev van Helsdingen, 2009 – Greece
L. concavus (Oi, 1960) – Japan
L. coomansi Bosmans, 1979 – Kenya
L. cruciformis Tanasevitch, 1989 – Kyrgyzstan
L. cruentatus Tanasevitch, 1987 – Caucasus (Russia, Georgia)
L. cultellifer Schenkel, 1936 – China
L. deosaicola Caporiacco, 1935 – Karakorum
L. dilutus (Thorell, 1875) – Sweden
L. dolichoskeles Scharff, 1990 – Tanzania
L. emarginatus Fage, 1931 – Algeria
L. encaustus (Becker, 1879) – Romania, Moldova
L. ensifer Barrientos, 2020 – Morocco
L. erigonoides Schenkel, 1936 – China
L. escapus Tanasevitch, 1989 – Turkmenistan
L. exvaginatus Deeleman-Reinhold, 1984 – Algeria
L. fadriquei Barrientos, 2020 – Morocco
L. fernandezi Berland, 1924 – Chile (Juan Fernandez Is.)
L. furcillifer Chamberlin & Ivie, 1933 – USA
L. gadesi Fage, 1931 – Spain
L. garganicus Caporiacco, 1951 – Italy
L. hamifer Simon, 1884 – France, China
L. hirsutus Tanasevitch, 1988 – Russia (Far East)
L. hissaricus Tanasevitch, 1989 – Tajikistan
L. howelli Jocqué & Scharff, 1986 – Tanzania
L. hublei Bosmans, 1986 – Cameroon
L. hummeli Schenkel, 1936 – China
L. hunanensis Yin, 2012 – China
L. ibericus Ribera, 1981 – Spain
L. imazigheni Barrientos, 2020 – Morocco
L. impudicus Kulczyński, 1909 – Madeira
L. incertissimus Caporiacco, 1935 – Karakorum
L. inopinatus Locket, 1968 – Congo
L. intricatus (Emerton, 1911) – USA, Canada
L. iranicus Saaristo & Tanasevitch, 1996 – Iran
L. japonicus Oi, 1960 – Japan
L. kansuensis Schenkel, 1936 – China
L. kekenboschi Bosmans, 1979 – Kenya
L. kenyensis Bosmans, 1979 – Kenya
L. kilimandjaricus Tullgren, 1910 – Tanzania
L. kolymensis Tanasevitch & Eskov, 1987 – Russia (north-eastern Siberia, Far East)
L. kratochvili Fage, 1945 – Greece (Crete)
L. lamellatus Barrientos, 2020 – Morocco
L. latrobei Millidge, 1995 – Indonesia (Krakatau)
L. latus Paik, 1965 – Korea
L. lebronneci Berland, 1935 – Marquesas Is.
L. leknizii Barrientos, 2020 – Morocco
L. leprosus (Ohlert, 1865) – North America, Europe, Turkey, Caucasus, Russia (Europe to Far East), Kazakhstan. Introduced to Chile
L. leucocerus Locket, 1968 – Angola
L. leucopygius Denis, 1939 – France
L. lingsoka Tikader, 1970 – India
L. linzhiensis Hu, 2001 – China
L. locketi van Helsdingen, 1977 – Angola, Kenya
L. longihamatus Bosmans, 1985 – Morocco
L. longipedis Tanasevitch, 2014 – Morocco
L. louettei Jocqué, 1985 – Comoros
L. lundbladi Schenkel, 1938 – Madeira
L. luteipes (L. Koch, 1879) – Russia (Urals to Far East), Kazakhstan, Mongolia, China, Japan
L. maculatus (Banks, 1900) – USA
L. maesi Bosmans, 1986 – Cameroon
L. magnesiae Brignoli, 1979 – Albania, Greece
L. manengoubensis Bosmans, 1986 – Cameroon
L. mauli Wunderlich, 1992 – Madeira
L. maurusius Brignoli, 1978 – Morocco
L. mbaboensis Bosmans, 1986 – Cameroon
L. meillonae Denis, 1953 – France
L. messapicus Caporiacco, 1939 – Italy
L. micromegethes Locket, 1968 – Angola
L. microserratus Petrunkevitch, 1930 – Puerto Rico
L. minusculus Locket, 1968 – Congo
L. minutus (Blackwall, 1833) (type) – Europe
L. msuyai Scharff, 1990 – Tanzania
L. natalis Bosmans, 1986 – Cameroon
L. nenilini Tanasevitch, 1988 – Russia (Middle Siberia to Far East)
L. neocaledonicus Berland, 1924 – New Caledonia
L. nigridorsus Caporiacco, 1935 – Karakorum
L. nigropictus Bosmans, 1979 – Kenya
L. nitidior Simon, 1929 – France
L. nodifer Simon, 1884 – Europe
L. noronhensis Rodrigues, Brescovit & Freitas, 2008 – Brazil
L. notabilis Kulczyński, 1887 – Europe
L. obtusicornis Bosmans, 1979 – Kenya
L. okuensis Bosmans, 1986 – Cameroon
L. opilio Simon, 1929 – France
L. palmeroensis Wunderlich, 1992 – Canary Is.
L. patulus Locket, 1968 – Angola
L. pennatus Scharff, 1990 – Tanzania
L. peramplus (O. Pickard-Cambridge, 1885) – India
L. perfidus Tanasevitch, 1985 – Central Asia
L. phallifer Fage, 1931 – Spain
L. phialoides Scharff, 1990 – Tanzania
L. pieltaini Machado, 1940 – Morocco
L. pratorum Caporiacco, 1935 – Karakorum
L. rainieri Emerton, 1926 – Canada
L. rimicola Lawrence, 1964 – South Africa
L. rossitsae Dimitrov, 2018 – Turkey
L. rubescens Emerton, 1926 – Canada
L. rudrai Tikader, 1970 – India
L. ruwenzori Jocqué, 1985 – Congo, Uganda
L. sardous Gozo, 1908 – Italy (Sardinia)
L. sasi Barrientos, 2020 – Morocco
L. saurensis Eskov, 1995 – Kazakhstan
L. serratus Oi, 1960 – Japan
L. silvamontanus Bosmans & Jocqué, 1983 – Cameroon
L. simiensis Bosmans, 1978 – Ethiopia
L. speculae Denis, 1959 – Lebanon
L. stramineus (O. Pickard-Cambridge, 1885) – India
L. striatiformis Caporiacco, 1934 – Karakorum
L. strinatii Hubert, 1970 – Tunisia
L. styx Wunderlich, 2011 – Canary Is.
L. subtilis Tanasevitch, 1989 – Kyrgyzstan
L. tamara Chamberlin & Ivie, 1943 – USA
L. taza Tanasevitch, 2014 – Morocco
L. todillus Simon, 1929 – France
L. trivittatus Caporiacco, 1935 – Karakorum
L. tropicalis Tullgren, 1910 – Tanzania
L. tullgreni Bosmans, 1978 – Tanzania
L. turanicus Tanasevitch & Fet, 1986 – Turkmenistan
L. turbatrix (O. Pickard-Cambridge, 1877) – North America, Greenland
L. ultimus Tanasevitch, 1989 – Tajikistan
L. umbratilis (Keyserling, 1886) – USA
L. vanstallei Bosmans, 1986 – Cameroon
L. venereus Simon, 1913 – Algeria
L. vividus Denis, 1955 – Lebanon
L. yueluensis Yin, 2012 – China
L. yushuensis Hu, 2001 – China
L. zhangmuensis Hu, 2001 – China

See also
 List of Linyphiidae species (I–P)

References

Araneomorphae genera
Cosmopolitan spiders
Linyphiidae